German submarine U-442 was a Type VIIC U-boat of Nazi Germany's Kriegsmarine during World War II.

The submarine was laid down on 19 October 1940 at the Schichau-Werke in Danzig as yard number 1493, launched on 17 January 1942, and commissioned on 21 March 1942 under the command of Fregattenkapitän Hans-Joachim Hesse.

U-442 first served with the 5th U-boat Flotilla, a training unit, and then operationally with the 7th flotilla from 1 October 1942 until the time of her loss.

Design
German Type VIIC submarines were preceded by the shorter Type VIIB submarines. U-442 had a displacement of  when at the surface and  while submerged. She had two shafts and two  propellers.

U-442 was fitted with five  torpedo tubes (four fitted at the bow and one at the stern), fourteen torpedoes, one  SK C/35 naval gun, 220 rounds, and a  C/30 anti-aircraft gun. The boat had a complement of between forty-four and sixty.

Service history

First patrol
U-442 departed Kiel on 17 September 1942 for her first operational war patrol. Heading via the North Sea toward the north-central Atlantic Ocean, she was near Iceland when convoy UR-42 was sighted. At 16.16 hours on 25 September, U-442 torpedoed and sank her first target, the  British steam merchant ship . Ten of Empire Bells 37 crew died in the attack, the survivors were picked up by the Norwegian merchantman Lysaker IV and landed at Reykjavík. Over a month would pass before U-442 crossed paths with the second and final target of this patrol, the  British ammunition ship Hatimura. Already on fire and slowly sinking from an attack three hours earlier (delivered by ), the hit resulted in a catastrophic explosion which threw debris in a large radius around the ship. It is believed U-132 was still nearby and was sunk as a result of this detonation. The patrol was terminated at St. Nazaire in occupied France on 16 November 1942.

Second patrol
Her second patrol began 20 December 1942, when she sortied from St. Nazaire bound for the central Atlantic via the Bay of Biscay. On the morning of 9 January 1943, U-442 attacked convoy TM 1 west of the Canary Islands, claiming hits on two tankers. In reality only one was hit, the  steam tanker . Fourteen men were lost in this attack. The escorts attempted to scuttle the British tanker with gunfire before breaking off their efforts and heading for Gibraltar to land the survivors. Seven hours later (14.50 hours), the burning, drifting tanker was located again by U-442, which torpedoed her a second time; still she would not go down. Finally, a third torpedo at 19.38 hours sent the tanker to the bottom.

On 27 January 1943 U-442 attacked the  American Liberty Ship Julia Ward Howe, a straggler from convoy UGS-4. The first torpedo hit on the starboard side, blowing off a hatch cover, wrecking two lifeboats and destroying the radio equipment. The ship immediately took on a 15-degree list but flooded slowly, gradually righting herself to an even keel. Three shots were fired from the merchantman's defensive 5-inch gun, but no hits were scored. Three men, including the ship's master, died in the attack; seventy-one abandoned ship. One more (the chief engineer), subsequently died of his wounds. Forty minutes after the initial attack, a torpedo struck amidships and broke the ship in two. The submarine then surfaced and took the second mate on board for questioning, releasing him afterward. As the U-boat departed the area, the rafts were secured together and steered toward the Azores. Fifteen hours later, they were rescued by the Portuguese destroyer Lima and landed at Ponta Delgada.

Loss
U-442 met her end on 12 February 1943. She was attacked and sunk by 3 depth charges from British Hudson 'F' aircraft of 48 Squadron RAF, piloted by Flying Officer G.R. Mayhew, west of Cape St. Vincent, Portugal. 
She was sighted on the surface and attacked from astern.
Her wreck lies at position .

Wolfpacks
U-442 took part in five wolfpacks, namely:
 Luchs (27 September – 6 October 1942) 
 Panther (6 – 12 October 1942) 
 Leopard (12 – 19 October 1942) 
 Veilchen (27 October – 4 November 1942) 
 Delphin (26 December 1942 – 12 February 1943)

Summary of raiding history

References

Bibliography

External links

German Type VIIC submarines
U-boats commissioned in 1942
U-boats sunk in 1943
U-boats sunk by depth charges
U-boats sunk by British aircraft
World War II submarines of Germany
World War II shipwrecks in the Atlantic Ocean
1942 ships
Ships built in Danzig
Ships built by Schichau
Ships lost with all hands
Maritime incidents in February 1943